Rebecca Sartori (born 22 May 1997) is an Italian hurdler.

Career
In 2022, setting in Grosseto her personal best in the 400 m hs with 55.40 she also achieved the entry standard to the cent for the participation in the 2022 World Athletics Championships in Eugene, Oregon.

See also
Italian all-time top lists - 400 metres hurdles

References

External links
 

1997 births
Living people
Athletics competitors of Fiamme Oro
Italian female hurdlers
Mediterranean Games gold medalists in athletics
20th-century Italian women
21st-century Italian women
Athletes (track and field) at the 2022 Mediterranean Games
Mediterranean Games gold medalists for Italy